Takifugu pseudommus is a species of pufferfish in the family Tetraodontidae. It is native to the Northwest Pacific, where it is known from the Yellow Sea and the East China Sea. It is a demersal species that reaches 35 cm (13.8 inches) SL, and it is reported to be poisonous.

References 

pseudommus
Fish described in 1935